Tan Yueheng is a Hong Kong politician who is one of the elected Legislative Council members for the Election Committee constituency. In addition to public office, he is the chairman and executive director of the BOCOM International Holdings Company Limited.

In January 2022, Tan was one of three people, out of 90 legislative council members, who took his oath using Mandarin rather than the local dialect of Cantonese.

On 5 January 2022, Carrie Lam announced new warnings and restrictions against social gathering due to potential COVID-19 outbreaks. One day later, it was discovered that Tan attended a birthday party hosted by Witman Hung Wai-man, with 222 guests. At least one guest tested positive with COVID-19, causing all guests to be quarantined.

According to the information from Chinese companies, Tan is a member of the Chinese Communist Party, which he declined to comment on. Thus, Tan is said to be the "first communist in Hong Kong parliament".

Electoral history

References 

Living people
1962 births
HK LegCo Members 2022–2025
Members of the Election Committee of Hong Kong, 2021–2026
Hong Kong pro-Beijing politicians